Agonopterix liturosa is a moth of the family Depressariidae. It is found in most of Europe (except most of the Balkan Peninsula). It is also found in the Near East and the eastern part of the Palearctic realm.

Adults are on wing from July to August.

The larvae feed on Hypericum species. They spin together the shoots of their host plant and feed from within. Larvae can be found from May to June. They are whitish grey-green with a silky sheen and a yellowish brown head.

References

External links
lepiforum.de

Moths described in 1811
Agonopterix
Moths of Europe
Moths of Asia